Shark Fin is the peak which has the triangular shape of a shark fin when viewed from the south.

Mountains of Victoria Land
Scott Coast